IAO Chant From The Cosmic Inferno is an album by the Japanese group The Acid Mothers Temple and the Cosmic Inferno released in 2005 by Ace Fu Records.  The album contains one piece, nearly an hour long, based on the Gong song Master Builder. Acid Mothers Temple covered Master Builder again in 2012 on IAO Chant From The Melting Paraiso Underground Freak Out.

Track listing
 "OM Riff" – 51:25

Personnel
 Tabata Mitsuru - bass, vocal, maratab
 Higashi Hiroshi - electronics
 Shimura Koji - drums
 Okano Futoshi - drums
 Kawabata Makoto - guitar, chant, hurdygurdy

Technical personnel
 Kawabata Makoto - production, engineering
 Yoshida Tatsuya - digital mastering

References

2005 albums
Acid Mothers Temple albums